The hairy-crested antbird (Rhegmatorhina melanosticta) is a species of bird in the family Thamnophilidae. It is found in Bolivia, Brazil, Colombia, Ecuador, and Peru. Its natural habitat is subtropical or tropical moist lowland forests.

The hairy-crested antbird is a specialist ant-follower that relies on swarms of army ants to flush insects and other arthropods out of the leaf litter.

The hairy-crested antbird was described by the English ornithologists Philip Sclater and Osbert Salvin in 1880 and given the binomial name Pithys melanosticta. The present genus Rhegmatorhina was introduced by the American ornithologist Robert Ridgway in 1888. The specific epithet melanosticta is from the Ancient Greek melanostiktos meaning "black-spotted". It combines melas meaning "black" and stiktos  meaning "spotted".

References

Further reading

hairy-crested antbird
hairy-crested antbird
Birds of the Colombian Amazon
Birds of the Ecuadorian Amazon
Birds of the Peruvian Amazon
Birds of the Bolivian Amazon
hairy-crested antbird
hairy-crested antbird
hairy-crested antbird
Taxonomy articles created by Polbot